The Florida Complex League Yankees are a Rookie-level affiliate of the New York Yankees, competing in the Florida Complex League of Minor League Baseball. The team is composed mainly of players who are in their first year of professional baseball either as selections from the Major League Baseball draft or as non-drafted free agents. The team plays its home games at George M. Steinbrenner Field in Tampa, Florida. Prior to 2021, the team was known as the Gulf Coast League Yankees, and fielded two squads in several seasons, differentiated by suffixes. The team (or one of its two squads) has won the league championship 12 times, most recently in 2017 by the GCL Yankees East squad.

History 
The Yankees originally fielded a team in the Sarasota Rookie League and the Florida Rookie League in 1964 and 1965, which were direct predecessors to the Gulf Coast League (GCL). The team competed in the GCL during 1966, then was absent from the league through 1979. Since 1980, the team has fielded at least one squad in the league each season.

In 2013, the Yankees began fielding two squads in the league, originally differentiated by "1" and "2" suffixes. The suffixes were changed to "East" and "West" in 2016, as the squads played in the Northeast and Northwest division, respectively. In 2019, both teams moved into the North Division. 

Prior to the 2021 season, the Gulf Coast League was renamed as the Florida Complex League (FCL). The Yankees returned to fielding a single squad in 2021.

Season-by-season

Roster

Notable alumni
Hall of Famers:
Mariano Rivera (Inducted 2019)
Derek Jeter (Inducted 2020)

References

External links
GCL Yankees Roster

Baseball teams established in 1964
Florida Complex League teams
Professional baseball teams in Florida
New York Yankees minor league affiliates
1964 establishments in Florida
Sports teams in Tampa, Florida